Halfway Island is an island lying  northwest of Litchfield Island, off the southwest coast of Anvers Island in the Palmer Archipelago. It was surveyed by the British Naval Hydrographic Survey Unit in 1956–1957. The name arose because the island lies halfway between Arthur Harbor and Cape Monaco, a route frequently traveled by boat by members of the Falkland Islands Dependencies Survey (FIDS) at the Arthur Harbor station.

See also
 Composite Antarctic Gazetteer
 List of Antarctic and sub-Antarctic islands
 List of Antarctic islands south of 60° S
 SCAR
 Territorial claims in Antarctica

References

External links

Islands of the Palmer Archipelago